Grevillea mimosoides, commonly known as caustic bush, is a species of flowering plant in the family Proteaceae and is endemic to northern Australia. It is a shrub or small tree with curved, narrowly elliptic or egg-shaped leaves and greenish-white to cream-coloured or pale yellow flowers.

Description

TaxonomyGrevillea mimosoides was first formally described in 1810 by Robert Brown in Transactions of the Linnean Society of London from specimens collected near the coast of the Gulf of Carpentaria. The specific epithet (mimosoides) means "Mimosa''-like".

Distribution and habitat
Caustic bush grows in shrubland or woodland, often in seasonally wet areas, and is found in the northern and western Kimberley region of Western Australia, the northern part of the Northern Territory, and north of Cloncurry, Chillagoe and Mareeba in northern Queensland.

References

mimosoides
Eudicots of Western Australia
Flora of the Northern Territory
Flora of Queensland
Proteales of Australia
Plants described in 1810
Taxa named by Robert Brown (botanist, born 1773)